Dantu railway station, formerly known as Sanshan West railway station during construction, is a railway station of Shanghai-Nanjing Intercity Railway located in Dantu District, Zhenjiang, Jiangsu, People's Republic of China.

During the construction of the Lianyungang–Zhenjiang high-speed railway, this station was rebuilt.

References

Railway stations in Jiangsu
Stations on the Shanghai–Nanjing Intercity Railway